Harry D. Jacobs High School (commonly referred to as Jacobs or HDJ) is a public high school for students in grades 9 through 12 located in Algonquin, Illinois, a suburb of Chicago, serving students from the west half of the Village of Algonquin and its surrounding areas, including Lake in the Hills, Gilberts, some of Sleepy Hollow, some of Carpentersville, and some of West Dundee. The school is located in McHenry County but also draws students from Northern Kane County.

Harry D. Jacobs High School is part of Community Unit School District 300, and one of three high schools serving the district. Feeder schools to Jacobs include Westfield Community School and Dundee Middle School (partial). The school is a member of the Illinois High School Association, Fox Valley Conference.

Demographics
The demographic breakdown of the 2,043 students enrolled in 2019-2020 was:
White - 63.5%
Hispanic - 20.4%
Asian- 8.9%
Black - 3.3%
Native American/Alaskan - 0.1%
Pacific Islander- 0.1%
Multiracial - 3.7%

24% of students were classified as low income.

Athletics and Activities 
Jacobs High School offers the following programs:

Athletics

 Girls: Basketball, Bowling, Cheerleading (Football Season), Cheerleading (Competitive Season), Cross Country, Dance (Football Season), Dance (Competitive Season), Golf, Lacrosse, Soccer, Softball, Swimming, Tennis, Track & Field, and Volleyball
 Boys: Baseball, Basketball, Cross Country, Football, Golf, Lacrosse, Soccer, Swimming, Tennis, Track & Field, and Wrestling

Activities

 Academic Challenge, Art Club, Bass Choir, Black Youth Alliance (BYA), Book Club, Chess Club, College Prep Club, Debate, Drama Club, Eagle Minds Matter (EMM), Film Production Club, Gender & Sexuality Alliance (GSA), German Club, Graphic Design Club, Hispanic Youth Alliance, Green Eagles, Interact, Key Club, Marching Band, Multicultural Club, Newspaper (The Talon), National Honor Society (NHS), Peer Mediation, Photography Club, Robotics Club, Scholastic Bowl, Spanish Club, Student Voices Club, Student Council, Tri-M Music Honor Society, and Yearbook Club

Music

 Jacobs offers multiple programs in Band, Chorus, and Orchestra.

Advanced Placement 
Jacobs offers AP courses in the following subjects: Biology, Calculus AB, Calculus BC, Chemistry, Computer Science A, Computer Science Principles, English Language, English Literature, Environmental Science, Human Geography, Macroeconomics, Music Theory, Physics 1, Physics C, Psychology, Research, Seminar, Spanish Language, Spanish Literature, Statistics, Studio Art, US Government, and US History.

Notable alumni
 Doug Feldmann, author and professional baseball scout
 Ryan Hartman, AHL/NHL hockey player
 Evan Jager, professional runner, Olympic and world championships medalist
 Adam Neylon, Wisconsin legislator and businessman
 Cameron Krutwig, Basketball player

References

External links
 Official website

Public high schools in Illinois
Schools in McHenry County, Illinois
Algonquin, Illinois